Abdeltawab Youssef Ahmed Youssef (Arabic: عبد التواب يوسف) was an Egyptian author, translator, and publisher.

Biography
Also known as Abd Al-Tawwab Yousef Ahmad Yousef, Abdel-Tawab Yusuf, and Abdel-Tawab Jusef, he was born in the village of Shanra, Beni Suef Governorate, Egypt, on 1 October 1928.

He earned a BA degree in political science from Cairo University. After graduating, he worked as a supervisor for school radio programs at the Ministry of Education. 
Then he headed the Department of Journalism, Radio and Television. He works so until he devoted himself to writing for children since 1975. He had the idea of issuing the first Islamic magazine for children, Paradise (Al-firdous) in 1969, and established the first conference on Child Culture in 1970. 

He established the Children's Society, and specialized in children's literature. He was distinguished by his wide culture and concerns to present everything that is useful. 25 million copies of his books were published in Egypt, Beirut, Iraq, Kuwait, Qatar and Muscat. Some of his books have been translated into English, French, German, Persian, Indonesian, Chinese and Malaysian.

Among the most prominent prizes he received were:

 2000 Bologna International Children's Book Fair for The Life of Muhammad in Twenty Stories
 State Prize for Children's Literature in 1975
 State Prize of Appreciation for Child Culture in 1981
 King Faisal International Prize for Arabic Literature in 1991
 Armed Forces Prize for Literature in October 1992
 First Prize in the competition for the best children's writer in 1998
 Suzanne Mubarak Prize in 1999 and 2000; With the Order of Sciences and Arts, First Class
 State Merit Prize for Children's Literature in 1981
 UNESCO World Literacy Prize in 1975
 Gold Medal from the Arab Broadcasting Union.

He died on 28 September 2015, three days before his 87th birthday.

His life

His birth, childhood and youth 
Abdel Tawab-Youssef was born in the village of Shanra, in the city of Al-Fashn, in the governorate of Beni Suef, on 1 October  1928. He received his primary and secondary education in the city of Beni Suef. He lived his childhood in the villages of Egypt and expressed this in his stories and creative works, as he used to rent novels and books to read and then repeat their story to his friends who are children.  
     
He moved to Cairo in 1945 to begin his university studies at the Faculty of Economics and Political Science at Cairo University until he obtained a bachelor's degree in 1949. Six months after his graduation in January 1950, his father died, which posed a great challenge to him in his life, as he decided to move to Cairo With his mother and three sisters, between the ages of six and ten, to live, earn a living and educate his sisters. He obtained a master's degree in 1953.

His Marriage 
In 1956, he married Natila Ibrahim Rashid, former editor-in-chief of Samir Magazine and Crescent Books for Children, winner of the State Prize in Children's Literature in 1978 and the First Class Medal of Science and Arts.

They had three children:

 Lubna (born 1957), professor at the Department of English at the Faculty of Arts at Cairo University; faculty vice-dean for postgraduate studies.
 Hisham (born 1959), a diplomat; official spokesman and head of the office of the Secretary-General of the Arab League; head of the relief unit in the Organization of Islamic Cooperation in Jeddah, Saudi Arabia.
 Essam (born 1965), managing director of the Egyptian International Company for Environmental Protection; general manager for Montana Studios for Film Production; author of two novels.

Years of work 
His first children's work was broadcast on the Papa Charu program on 19 December 1950.

Since then, he wrote thousands of programs for children, which were presented on all Arab radio stations. He worked as a supervisor for school radio programs at the Ministry of Education after graduating from the university from 1950 to 1960. Then he headed the Department of Journalism, Radio and Television in them from 1960 to 1971; Then he headed the Culture Department from 1971 to 1975.

In the early 1970s, his first trips to the outside world was to Europe, and on this trip he got acquainted with new dimensions in the field of children's literature, then his interest in new dimensions increased when the Cairo International Book Fair was held, which allowed him to learn about the various schools and trends that interest children and write for him. He chose to write about religious aspect, nationalism, national values, educational attempts, science and its fields, the Arabic language, its nobility, ancient and modern, humanistic trends, recreation and entertainment, writing for the child and about the child and childhood. Until he devoted himself to writing for children since 1975, after a five-year break in political work. He stated in one of his press interviews, saying: “He showed me more of a reader than I am a writer, and during my travels I bought thousands of books until I had a library that says those who visited it from the English And the Americans, it is the largest home library for children in the world.”

He bought an apartment in which he deposited 30,000 books for children, left 10,000 books in his house, and deposited 5,000 books in his son's library.

Abdel Tawab-Youssef was a member of the Board of Directors of the Association of the Protectors of the Arabic Language since its inception and of the Children's Culture Committee of the Supreme Council of Culture since its inception, where he was its deputy rapporteur and the Family and Child Committee of the Supreme Council of Islamic Affairs, founder of the Egyptian Writers Union, and a member of the board of directors for twenty years. He served as Secretary-General for three years and witnessed the Federation's symposium on children's literature in Damascus, Baghdad and Bani Ghazi. He presented 595 books for children printed in Egypt, 125 books for children that were printed in the Arab countries, and 40 books for adults.

Literary style 
The family climate in which he was raised played a role in his literary style. He grew up in a middle class that made his writing influenced by the religious stories he presented in the form of hadiths for children.

He took an independent approach to writing, highlighting the focus on Islamic values and working on the merging of scientific and religious information at the same time. He said: "My methodology in writing for children begins with establishing a belief and then loving the Noble Qur’an for them. The children's memorizing verses of the Qur'an elevate them to the noble and miraculous style of the Qur'an. In my stories, I focused on birds and animals mentioned in the Holy Quran, which total 30 birds and animals. I started with a story about the whale, so I said I am a whale that weighs 75 tons, even though my egg cannot be seen with the naked eye."

Literary production 
His writings were characterized by diversity, and he drew inspiration from world folklore, religious heritage and Arab history. He employed Arab culture and Arab environments in his production. He enriched the Arab Library with a total of 951 literary works; 595 children's books were printed in Egypt; And 125 children's books were printed in the Arab countries; And 40 books for adults; In addition to two writers about the Prophet Muhammad's life in twenty stories, of which 7 million copies were printed; In addition to the field fiction, which printed 3,000,000 copies.

His most prominent works for adults and children

New works

Pillars of Islam series 5 x 5

Peace Language Series for Children and Young People

A series of stories of the miracles of the prophets

Let us Educate series

The best trip series

Palestinian Championships series

Awards 
Tawab-Youssef received many awards and honors such as: 
 The Bologna International Children's Book Fair 2000 
 State Prize for Children's Literature in 1975
 The UNESCO World Literacy Prize 1975
 The State Prize of Appreciation for Child Culture in 1981
 The King Faisal Prize in Arabic Literature 1991
 The Armed Forces Prize for Literature in October 1992
 First Prize in the competition for the Best Children's Writer in 1998
 The Suzanne Mubarak Prize in 1999 and 2000
 The Order of Sciences and Arts of the First Class
 Gold medal from the Arab Broadcasting Union.

His efforts in the Arab world 
Abdul Tawab-Yousef visited the United Arab Emirates to follow up on literacy efforts and participated in seminars and activities to eradicate illiteracy for children in Arab countries. Attended the Dubai Symposium on Children's Literature in 2004. An envoy from UNESCO, he visited Qatar three times to participate in seminars. Founded and headed the Children's Culture Association since 1968.

Sayings about him 
Suheir Al-Qalamawi said of him: "There are many people who write for children. But only a few have produced real literature, and ... Youssef is at their forefront, in terms of quantity and quality."
 
       
Desan Roul, President of the International Association for Children's Books, said of him: "Abd al-Tawab Youssef's library is the largest children's library in a household in all the world, and his books apply the same thing."

His death 
Abdel-Tawab Youssef died on the afternoon of Monday 28 September 2015, three days before his 87th birthday, following a health crisis that had afflicted him for several months. He left more than 1,000 children's books, achieving a record for a writer in Egypt and the world.   
 The funeral took place at the Hosary Mosque on 6  October.

References 

Egyptian novelists
Egyptian translators
Arab translators
20th-century Egyptian writers
21st-century Egyptian writers
Egyptian children's writers
1928 births
2015 deaths